van Lottum is a surname. Notable people with the surname include:

John van Lottum (born 1976), Dutch tennis player
Noëlle van Lottum (born 1972), Dutch-born French tennis player

Surnames of Dutch origin